Glegg is a surname. Notable people with the surname include:

Alex Glegg (born 1971), former Canadian cricketer
John Glegg, soldier in the 49th Regiment of Foot of the British Army
William Glegg, the founder of the Calday Grange Grammar School

See also
Gregg (surname)